is a 2017 Japanese zombie comedy film written and directed by Shin'ichirō Ueda. It follows a team of actors and filmmakers who are tasked with shooting a zombie film for live television, and who must do so in a single take.

Following its international success at its screening at the Udine Film Festival, the film began getting wider exposure, including a re-release in Japan. It grossed US $27,935,711 in Japan and  worldwide, making box office history by earning over a thousand times its budget. The film also received acclaim from critics, who praised its originality, writing and humor.

Plot
In the first section of the film, the cast and crew of a low-budget zombie film called True Fear are shooting at an abandoned water filtration plant. Director Higurashi, desperate for film success due to mounting debts, and frustrated at the actors' work, arranges for a blood pentagram to be painted to activate real zombies per the plant's haunted past. Cameraman Hosoda turns into a zombie and bites assistant director Kasahara, turning him as well. Actress Chinatsu, actor Ko, and makeup artist Nao lock the zombies out of the plant. Higurashi insists they continue filming using the real zombies. The sound engineer rushes out of the plant and is infected. Higurashi brings zombified sound engineer back in for more footage, throwing him at the other humans. Nao decapitates the zombified sound engineer and is splattered with zombie blood.

Chinatsu, Ko, and Nao attempt to escape, but Higurashi facilitates an attack by zombified Kasahara while he films. Chinatsu is confronted by the zombies and saved by Ko. They reunite with Nao, who suspects that Chinatsu is infected. Nao attempts to kill Chinatsu and chases her, dispatching the zombies in the process during the chase. Chinatsu escapes to a roof, with Nao and Ko following. Offscreen, Ko kills Nao with an axe to save Chinatsu. Chinatsu thinks she is infected and runs away to a building with a pentagram painted on the outside wall. An unidentified zombie approaches Chinatsu and leaves. Chinatsu finds an axe outside the building where she was hiding. Chinatsu sees Ko going back to the roof and finds Ko has been zombified. Chinatsu confronts zombified Ko in a variation of the scene at the start of the film, and after being briefly interrupted by a mysteriously revived Nao, Chinatsu decapitates zombified Ko. Higurashi berates Chinatsu for going off script. Chinatsu kills Higurashi, and she ends the first section by standing on the blood pentagram in a trance-like state.

The second section of the film involves the personal lives of the real cast and crew of the One Cut of the Dead production as they prepare to make the one-shot take. One Cut of the Dead is also revealed to be a live show, so no reshoots or delays are possible.

The third section of the film depicts the chaotic shooting of One Cut of the Dead from behind the scenes. Two main actors could not make filming, forcing director Takayuki Higurashi and his wife Harumi Higurashi to step in to fill the roles of the director and the makeup artist. It is revealed that during the shooting, Takayuki Higurashi overacted his first scene by physically accosting his fellow actor, then Manabu Hosoda (who played the cameraman) passed out drunk and later vomited, Shunsuke Yamagoe's diarrhea led to his character leaving the plant off-script, the main cameraman suffered a back injury and was replaced, Harumi Higurashi went off-script and attacked various real cast and crew during the scene of Nao chasing Chinatsu, forcing Takayuki Higurashi to choke her out, and later forcibly remove a revived Harumi Higurashi from interrupting the ending scene between Chinatsu and Ko. It is also revealed that the zombie which did not attack Chinatsu was a crew member giving instructions, while the camera crane was broken in an accident, leading to the real cast and crew forming a human pyramid to mimic a crane shot for the end of the first section. The faux-crane shot is successful, and the real cast and crew are elated at the successful filming.

The final credits are shown over shots of yet another film crew who are filming the events in the first section, including the faux-crane shot being taken from the top of a step ladder.

Cast
Takayuki Hamatsu as Takayuki Higurashi
Yuzuki Akiyama as Aika Matsumoto / Chinatsu
Kazuaki Nagaya as Kazuaki Kamiya / Ko / Ken
Harumi Shuhama as Harumi Higurashi / Nao
Manabu Hosoi as Manabu Hosoda
Hiroshi Ichihara as Hiroshi Yamanouchi
Shuntaro Yamazaki as Shunsuke Yamagoe
Shinichiro Osawa as Shinichiro Furusawa
Yoshiko Takehara (Donguri) as Yoshiko Sasahara
Sakina Asamori as Saki Matsuura
Miki Yoshida as Miki Yoshino
Ayana Goda as Ayana Kurihara
Mao as Mao Higurashi

Production
Filmmaker Shin'ichirō Ueda directed, edited, and wrote the script for One Cut of the Dead. Ueda, an independent filmmaker, had previously made several short films. For the film, he stated that One Cut of the Dead was partially inspired by Ryoichi Wada's stage play, Ghost in the Box, which Ueda had seen five years prior. Wada, a playwright and theater director, had presented Ghost in the Box from 2011 to 2014.

To make his film, Ueda worked with the Enbu Seminar drama school in Tokyo. Enbu Seminar not only produced the film, but also hosted the acting workshops that Ueda used to help cast its actors, most of them unknowns. According to actress Yuzuki Akiyama, the workshop lasted for two months. She had previously worked with Ueda on his 2011 short film, Dreaming Novelist.

Filming for One Cut of the Dead took place over the course of eight days in June 2017. It was shot at an abandoned water filtration plant in Mito, Ibaraki. Akiyama described the filming process as "very enjoyable but also pretty exhausting", due to the pressure to get a long take right. The long take in particular, a 37-minute-long continuous shot of the zombie film, took six takes.

After the eight days of shooting, it took four months for Ueda to edit the film.

Release
Producer and Enbu Seminar president Koji Ichihashi said that the initial target for the film to break even was 5,000 admissions. One Cut of the Dead opened in Japan in an 84-seat Tokyo art house theater with an initial theatrical run of six days. The film began garnering international attention after it became the runner-up in the audience vote at the Udine Far East Film Festival. Of the films screening at Udine, it received a standing ovation and the Audience Award at the Udine Far East Film Festival in year 2018.

After receiving positive reviews outside of Japan, the film was released in three cinemas in Tokyo in June with discounts for an audience in zombie costumes to help the film gain attention. Asmik Ace stepped in to co-distribute the film, giving it a wider release in July. It was showing at around 200 screens in Japan by March 2018 where it had officially grossed .

Reception

Box office
In Japan, the film sold 2,149,449 tickets and grossed  in 136 days. It became the seventh highest-grossing domestic film of 2018, grossing  at the Japanese box office. It made box office history by earning over a thousand times its budget.

Critical reception
On Rotten Tomatoes, the film holds a 100% "Certified Fresh" approval rating based on 91 reviews, with an average rating of 8.6/10. The site's critical consensus states, "Brainy and bloody in equal measure, One Cut of the Dead reanimates the moribund zombie genre with a refreshing blend of formal daring and clever satire." Metacritic reports an 86 out of 100 score, based on 14 reviews, indicating "universal acclaim".

Writing for Variety, Richard Kuipers declared the film to be a "marvelously inventive horror-comedy [that] breathes new life into the zombie genre", and attributed its success to "its irresistibly bouncy spirit [...] it positively sparkles with the infectious “C’mon everyone, let’s put on a show!” enthusiasm that’s served the movies so well since the days of Andy Hardy." Elizabeth Kerr of The Hollywood Reporter found the film to be "a breezy and often laugh-out-loud hilarious zombie comedy", noting that although the film "sags in the second act as it sets up the third, it’s not so much that it loses all the steam it generated out of the gate." David Ehrlich of IndieWire, opined that the film was "so heartfelt and hilarious that it’s easy to forgive the contrivances that hold it together, and to overlook how transparently Ueda reverse-engineers most of his best gags. Seemingly unimportant details in the film’s sluggish middle section blossom into killer jokes some 30 minutes later"

Alleged plagiarism 
In August 2018, Ryoichi Wada gave an interview where he stated that One Cut of the Dead was an adaptation of Ghost in the Box, and that he was consulting with his legal representatives. The month before, Wada had remarked on social media that he enjoyed the film. Ueda acknowledged that Ghost in the Box was an inspiration for his film, but denied that he plagiarized the play. Both Ueda and Wada eventually came to an agreement, crediting Wada and acknowledging Ghost in the Box in One Cut of the Dead's credits.

Awards

Sequels 
One Cut of the Dead Spin-Off: In Hollywood  (カメラを止めるな！スピンオフ ハリウッド大作戦！, Kamera o Tomeru na! Supin-ofu: Hariuddo daisakusen!, transl. "Don't Stop the Camera! Spin-Off : World-Wide") is a 59-minute feature that was made in 2019 for TV in Japan. Instead of Takayuki Higurashi, this film is about how his daughter Mao Higurashi makes a film just like what he did in One Cut of the Dead.

During the 2020 COVID-19 pandemic in Japan, Ueda decided to create a short film One Cut of the Dead Mission: Remote  (カメラを止めるな！リモート大作戦！, Kamera o Tomeru na! Rimōto dai sakusen!, transl. "Don't Stop the Camera! Remote Operation!") that would act as a sequel to One Cut of the Dead. The filmmaker wanted to create something that would lighten the mood during the pandemic, stating, "I started to wonder if there was anything positive I could do to try to put a smile on people’s faces through some light form of entertainment." After contacting the actors to confirm they would be able to reprise their role, Ueda wrote the script in one night, and gave the actors instructions via video conference. The actors were instructed to take selfie footage while in-character, then send the footage to the director via a smartphone messaging app. In addition, Ueda asked people on social media to upload video of themselves dancing to include in the movie.

The overall production of One Cut of the Dead Mission: Remote took place in around a month. It was uploaded to YouTube for people to watch for free on 1 May 2020.

Remake
A French-language remake titled Final Cut, directed by Michel Hazanavicius and starring Romain Duris and Bérénice Bejo, began its production in April 2021. It was shown as the opening film at the 2022 Cannes Film Festival.

See also
Dead Set
Noises Off

References

External links
 

Japanese comedy horror films
Japanese independent films
Found footage films
Japanese satirical films
2017 independent films
2017 comedy horror films
Zombie comedy films
Films shot in Japan
Films about filmmaking
One Cut of the Dead
2010s Japanese films
2010s Japanese-language films